The Großhadern Town Hall in Munich is the former town hall of the municipality of Großhadern, which was incorporated into Munich in 1938. The building is listed as a protected monument in the Bavarian protected monuments list.

Description 
The town hall is located in Großhadern in the Munich's district 20 of Hadern, at Würmtalstraße 126 in the north-west corner of the crossing of Würmtalstraße and Großhaderner Straße. It was built in 1930—31 according to the plans of Ludwig Zwingmann. This construction was meant to combine practicality and traditional building. The building served a twofold purpose from the beginning: the municipal chancery of Großhadern occupied only the ground floor, and in the upper floors were apartments.

The three-story building with a rectangular floor plan is about 35 meters long and about 12 meters wide and has a hipped roof. The façade looks more like an apartment house than a town hall. The official character of the building is emphasized by a bay tower carrying a spherical tower helmet with a weather vane. The ground floor of the narrow side is dominated by the two great gates of the Departement Großhadern of the volunteer fire department Munich (Munich Fire Department). A stone figure was placed between the two rows of windows on the upper floor.

References 

Buildings and structures in Munich
City and town halls in Germany
Registered historic buildings and monuments in Bavaria